The following is a list of national meetings of the Workers' Party of Korea. This article defines national meetings as party congresses and conferences of party representatives. 

The party Congress is nominally the highest body of the Workers' Party of Korea (WPK) according to its charter. The charter stated specifically that it should convene at least every fifth year; however, the congress has historically never managed to be convened in that time frame. There was a gap of 36 years between the 6th Congress and the 7th Congress. However, two party conferences were convened in the period 2010–2012. The 3rd Party Conference in 2010 formally deleted the five-year clause from the party charter, but it was later restored at the 8th Congress in 2021.

The Congress hears the reports of central authorities, makes amendments to the party's charter, sets the party's political line, elects the General Secretary of the Workers' Party of Korea, elects the Central Committee and elects the Central Auditing Commission. The 1st Plenary Session of the elected Central Committee then elects the Politburo, the Secretariat, the Central Military Commission and other bodies of the Central Committee. Despite this, as Fyodor Tertitskiy notes, "When it comes to the supreme leader of North Korea, it is not his position that makes him a leader; it is the person who makes a position one of leadership. Kim Jong-un may be called supreme commander, first chairman or even God-Emperor — it does not matter; he is in charge by right of bloodline." For example, Kim Jong-un's election as Chairman of the WPK at the 7th Party Congress did not mean that said Congress was previously empowered to make decisions independent of Kim Jong-un.

Keys

Meetings

Congresses

Conferences

References

Specific

Bibliography
Articles and journals:

General
Information on congresses & conferences, number of delegates, number of people elected to CCs, party membership, the individual who presented the Political Report and information on when the congress was convened can be found in these sources:

 
 
 
 

Congresses of the Workers' Party of Korea